Kaneko Shinkuro Morisada (c. 1520- c. 1585) was a direct student of Tose Yosazaemon Osamune the founder of the Tenshinsho Jigen Ryu. Kaneko later succeeded Osamune in becoming the second headmaster (soke) of the Tenshinsho Jigen Ryu. His best student was a warrior named Terasaka Yakuro Masatsune, who later became the monk Zenkitsu.

Kaneko's student Terasaka Yakuro Masatsune (Zenkitsu) became his successor as the third headmaster of the Tenshinsho Jigen Ryu.

Kaneko died in c. 1585.

References

Japanese martial artists
Japanese swordfighters
Samurai
Year of birth uncertain